Telegrafverket may refer to:

A former name of Televerket (Sweden)
A former name of Telenor